Justin Surrency (born January 9, 1984) is a former professional gridiron football wide receiver. He was signed by the Seattle Seahawks as an undrafted free agent in 2006. He played college football at Northern Iowa. Presently, he is a reporter/News presenter for WHO-TV in Des Moines, Iowa, and previously at WIBW-TV in Topeka, Kansas.

Surrency was also a member of the Amsterdam Admirals, Minnesota Vikings and Winnipeg Blue Bombers.

References

External links
Just Sports Stats
Minnesota Vikings bio
Northern Iowa Panthers bio

Further reading

1984 births
Living people
Players of American football from Saint Paul, Minnesota
Sportspeople from Saint Paul, Minnesota
American football wide receivers
Northern Iowa Panthers football players
Seattle Seahawks players
Amsterdam Admirals players
Minnesota Vikings players
Winnipeg Blue Bombers players